Fidel Chaves de la Torre (born 27 October 1989), known as Fidel Chaves or simply Fidel, is a Spanish professional footballer who plays for Elche CF as a left winger.

Club career
Born in La Dehesa de Ríotinto, Province of Huelva, Fidel finished his development at local Recreativo de Huelva, and made his senior debut with the B team in the 2008–09 season, in Tercera División. He played his first game as a professional on 15 May 2010, coming on as a second-half substitute and scoring his team's goal in a 1–1 away draw against Córdoba CF in the Segunda División.

On 12 July 2012, Fidel terminated his contract with the Andalusians and joined fellow league club Elche CF. He was an ever-present player in his first year, and also scored four goals as the Valencians returned to La Liga after 24 years of absence.

Fidel made his top-flight debut on 19 August 2013, playing 33 minutes in a 3–0 loss at Rayo Vallecano. His first league goal came on 20 October, the winner in a 2–1 away victory over Real Betis.

On 9 July 2014, Fidel joined fellow league side Córdoba in a loan deal. After appearing regularly, he agreed to a permanent move in May 2015.

On 19 July 2016, after scoring a career-best 11 goals during the campaign to earn a place in its All-Star team, Fidel put pen to paper to a five-year contract at UD Almería. On 18 June 2018, he signed a three-year deal with fellow second division club UD Las Palmas.

Fidel terminated his contract with the Canarians on 14 June 2019, and returned to Elche just hours later. The first goals of his second spell came on 3 November, when he scored a hat-trick – two from the penalty spot – in a 4–2 home defeat of CD Mirandés.

Career statistics

Club

References

External links

1989 births
Living people
Sportspeople from the Province of Huelva
Spanish footballers
Footballers from Andalusia
Association football wingers
La Liga players
Segunda División players
Tercera División players
Atlético Onubense players
Recreativo de Huelva players
Elche CF players
Córdoba CF players
UD Almería players
UD Las Palmas players